Nathaniel Mary Quinn (1977) is an American painter. Quinn is known for his collage-style composite portraits that feature disfigured faces.

Early life
Quinn was born in Chicago, where he grew up in the Robert Taylor Homes on the South Side. In his ninth grade of high school, he was awarded a scholarship to attend the Culver Military Academy in Indiana.

While he was at Culver, Quinn's mother, Mary, died. He later legally adopted the middle name Mary in memory so her name would appear on his degree.

When he returned home for thanksgiving a month after Mary's death, Quinn found the family home empty and his father and brother had gone. They left without a trace.

He was determined not to become impoverished and homeless, so he focused on completing his education.

Career
After graduating from NYU in 2002, Quinn continued to live in Brooklyn, where he continued to paint while teaching disadvantaged kids through Exalt youth program. 

In 2004, Quinn and author, Quanica A. McClendon, published a children's book called "Suit Shoes." Quinn used oil and canvas for the illustrations.

In 2013 he made his first major hit painting Charles. It was the first he made with his distinct collage-inspired style. He made a painting based on five photographs which produced an amalgamation resembling the smirk of his long-lost brother, Charles.

The artwork was shown in a home-based art salon run by the mother of one of his students. It caught the attention of the executive director of the Museum of Contemporary African Diasporan Arts in Brooklyn, who showed it in the museum's window.

In 2014 he held his first solo show at Pace Gallery in London.
 
During the fall of 2018, Quinn's work was included in a group show at The Drawing Center. Quinn's first solo museum exhibition, This Is Life, was presented at the Madison Museum of Contemporary Art, Wisconsin, from December 2018 to March 2019.

His work is included in the collection of the Pérez Art Museum Miami, Whitney Museum of American Art, the Hammer Museum, the MOCA, and the Art Institute of Chicago.

In 2019, Quinn became represented by Gagosian.

References

External links
Interview: "Was The Art Worth All The Pain?" on To the Best of Our Knowledge

1977 births
Living people
21st-century American artists
Culver Academies alumni